Roseli de Belo (born 7 September 1969), commonly known as Roseli, is a Brazilian footballer who played as a forward for the Brazil women's national football team.

She represented Brazil at the FIFA Women's World Cup in 1991 and 1995; as well as in the inaugural Olympic women's football tournament in 1996. She also played in the 2000 Olympics and was part of Brazil's silver medal-winning squad in 2004.

Roseli played professional club football in Japan with Takarazuka Bunnys and in the United States with Washington Freedom.

Club career
From 1995 until 1997 Roseli played professional football in the Japanese L. League with Takarazuka Bunnys.

When the professional Women's United Soccer Association (WUSA) started in 2001, Roseli and compatriot Pretinha were assigned to Washington Freedom in the inaugural draft. Washington performed poorly in their first season and bought out Roseli's contract after she failed to score in 11 appearances, only three of which were starts.

International career
Roseli was part of the EC Radar club team who represented Brazil at the 1988 FIFA Women's Invitation Tournament in Guangdong and finished in third place. The Chinese press voted her into the tournament's official all–star team.

At the 1991 FIFA Women's World Cup Roseli started Brazil's first ever World Cup match; a 1–0 group stage win over Japan in Foshan. Four years later she scored the only goal as Brazil shocked hosts Sweden 1–0 in the opening match of the 1995 FIFA Women's World Cup.

In December 1997 Roseli scored another game-winning goal, against the United States in her native São Paulo, giving Brazil their first ever victory over their American rivals.

Roseli scored 15 goals in qualifying for the 1999 FIFA Women's World Cup, but a knee injury sustained against the United States in 1998 kept her out of the final tournament. Without Roseli, Brazil reached the semi final but were knocked out by the United States. She returned to the national team for yet another match against the United States in September 1999.

When Brazil named their squad for the 2000 Olympics in Sydney, Roseli was included. She featured as a substitute in Brazil's 1–0 semi final defeat to the United States.

She was named equal third (level with Michael Jackson, behind Pretinha and Sissi) in the International Federation of Football History & Statistics (IFFHS) South America's best Women's Footballer of the Century list.

In October 2006, Roseli travelled with a São Paulo select team to participate in the Peace Queen Cup in South Korea.

References

External links
 
Saad EC profile

1969 births
Living people
Olympic footballers of Brazil
Footballers at the 1996 Summer Olympics
Footballers at the 2000 Summer Olympics
Footballers at the 2004 Summer Olympics
1995 FIFA Women's World Cup players
1991 FIFA Women's World Cup players
Olympic silver medalists for Brazil
Olympic medalists in football
Medalists at the 2004 Summer Olympics
Brazil women's international footballers
Brazilian women's footballers
Brazilian expatriate sportspeople in Japan
EC Radar players
Sport Club Corinthians Paulista (women) players
Brazilian expatriate women's footballers
Nadeshiko League players
Bunnys Kyoto SC players
Washington Freedom players
Women's United Soccer Association players
Expatriate women's soccer players in the United States
Expatriate women's footballers in Japan
Brazilian expatriate sportspeople in the United States
Footballers from São Paulo
Women's association football forwards
Saad Esporte Clube (women) players